Silvio Luiz Oliveira de Paula or simply Silvio Luiz (born 1 March 1977 in Rio de Janeiro), is a Brazilian retired footballer who played as a goalkeeper.

In his professional career, he mainly represented São Caetano (nine seasons). He last played for Boavista Sport Club.

Honours
São Caetano
São Paulo State League (3rd division): 1998
Pre-Olympic Tournament: 2000
São Paulo State League (2nd division): 2001
São Paulo State League: 2004

External links
 sambafoot
 CBF
 crvascodagama.com
 zerozero.pt
 Silvio Luiz official site

1977 births
Living people
Brazilian footballers
CR Flamengo footballers
Mirassol Futebol Clube players
Associação Desportiva São Caetano players
Sport Club Corinthians Paulista players
CR Vasco da Gama players
Boavista Sport Club players
Duque de Caxias Futebol Clube players
Association football goalkeepers
Footballers from Rio de Janeiro (city)